Torres is a city on the coast of south Brazil in the state of Rio Grande do Sul. The city has a population of approximately 40,000 inhabitants, of which 10,000 live in rural zones, but in summer the number of inhabitants reaches 300,000.

History
The municipality's name derives from the three basalt towers standing in the ocean, giving the beach its distinctive appearance. On March 21, 1878, by provincial law, Torres became a municipality. Today, with a population of 33,686 permanent inhabitants, Torres is an important tourist centre, with more than fifty hotels, restaurants and bars. Local cuisine is influenced by international and Mediterranean cuisine, with seafood prevailing.

Geography
Unlike the rest of the state's coast, which is uninterrupted sandy beach, Torres boasts four high rocky formations standing in the sea. These vertical columns are almost 40 meters high and contain several caves created by the action of the waves over the years, locally called furnas. These rocky formations rise up from the sea creating an impressive scenario.

Climate
The climate in Torres is humid subtropical (Cfa). Summers are warm and the hottest month is February, with an average temperature of 23 °C (73.4 °F). Winters are cool and the coldest month is July, with an average temperature of 15 °C (59 °F). The wettest month is March, with 142 mm (5.6 in) of precipitation. The average annual temperature in the city is 19 °C (66.2 °F) and the average annual precipitation is 1,390 mm (54.72 in), with rain regularly falling all year long.

On March 28, 2004, the Hurricane Catarina hit Torres with winds of about 150 km/h causing extensive damage. This was a rare event for the region.

Sites of interest 

The municipality contains the Guarita State Park, created in 1971 to protect a headland on the Atlantic Ocean.
It also contains the Itapeva State Park, created in 2002 to protect an area of dunes, restinga and meadows.

Tourists may visit the Ilha dos Lobos (Island of the Wolves), which is located directly in front of the Praia Grande beach, approximately 1700 meters off shore. Hiking is possible in the nearby mountains of the Serra do Mar.

Itapeva Beach is 6 km away, located beyond Guarita park. It takes its name from Itapeva hill. Itapeva in Tupi–Guarani means "crushed stone". Guarita Beach is located in Guarita Park, surrounded by the towers "Centro" – Centre -, "Sul" – South -, and Guarita after which the park was named.

Furnas Hill is the largest of the towers. It is also called torre do Meio – Middle tower. It lies six hundred meters away from the city lighthouse. Cal beach lies between them. Cal beach is eight hundred meters long; it is one of the preferred places for surfing practice. Its name derives from the ovens located here until 1940 used to heat shells for the lime.

Prainha beach (or do meio beach) is six hundred meters long. It has a rocky soil. Praia Grande beach is 2 km long; it is preferred for sea bathing and sports such as soccer, volleyball, surfing, kitesurfing and several others. Outdoor shows are also organized on Praia Grande beach.

Transportation
Torres is served by Torres Airport.

Surfing
Torres has some of the best surf spots in the state. Some of the best Brazilian surfers are from Torres.

Rocky mountains and other geological formations provide natural protection from strong winds and create good shape for the sea bottom, creating ideal surfing conditions.

The best season for surfing is winter (May–September), with waves up to 3 meters high and cold water. During the summer the waves are smaller and the northeast wind usually jeopardizes surfing conditions.

It is possible to practice Tow-in surfing in a point break near Ilha dos Lobos and waves as high as 10 meters have been registered there; however, access is difficult and good conditions are rare.

Hot air ballooning
Currently, Brazil is the Latin American country with the largest number of hot air balloons and hot air balloonists. There are about 45 hot air balloons for 30 registered pilots divided into three hot air ballooning clubs. These are located in São Paulo, Rio de Janeiro and Belo Horizonte. Since 1989, Torres has sponsored an annual hot air balloon festival, and in 1995, during its seventh season, the city gained the title of "Brazilian Capital of Hot Air Ballooning".

Gallery

References

External links
 Official city site
 Official tourism site
Satellite photo map from Google Maps

Populated coastal places in Rio Grande do Sul
Populated places established in 1878
Municipalities in Rio Grande do Sul